Nicola Evans (born 17 January 1990), also referred to as Nikki Evans, is an Ireland women's field hockey international. She was a member of the Ireland team that played in the 2018 Women's Hockey World Cup final. Evans has also won Women's Irish Hockey League titles with Railway Union, UCD and Hermes-Monkstown. In the 2013–14 Evans was a member the UCD team that completed a national double, winning both the league and the Irish Senior Cup.

Early years, family and education
Evans is originally from Clonskeagh, Dublin where she grew up as the eldest of three. She was educated at Sandford Parish NS and Alexandra College. Between 2009 and 2013 she attended University College Dublin. She graduated from UCD with a Bachelor of Business and Law. Between 2014 and 2017 she studied at the Law Society of Ireland and gained a Diploma in Sports Law.

Domestic teams

Alexandra College
Evans played for Alexandra College in three Leinster Schoolgirls' Senior Cup finals, regularly playing against teams that included future Ireland teammates. In the 2005 final she scored the opening goal in a 4–2 win over a High School, Dublin team that included Nicola Daly. In the 2007 final she scored again in a 5–0 win against a St. Andrew's College team that included Gillian Pinder and Chloe Watkins. In the 2008 final she finished on the losing as Alexandra lost to Loreto Beaufort.

Hermes
In 2008, while still a schoolgirl at Alexandra College, Evans, together with fellow schoolgirls, Anna O'Flanagan and Chloe Watkins, was a member of the Hermes team that won the All-Ireland Ladies' Club Championships. In 2008–09 Evans was also a member of the Hermes team that finished as runners up in the inaugural Women's Irish Hockey League season. Other members of the team included Anna O'Flanagan, Chloe Watkins and Gillian Pinder.

Railway Union
In 2009–10, together with Cecelia and Isobel Joyce, Emer Lucey and Kate McKenna, Evans was a member of the Railway Union team that won the Women's Irish Hockey League title. Evans scored as they defeated Cork Harlequins 4–1 in the final. Evans also played for Railway Union in the 2010 Irish Senior Cup final as they lost to Loreto after a penalty shoot-out. Evans was a Railway Union player when she made her senior debut for Ireland.

UCD
In 2013 together with Chloe Watkins, Anna O'Flanagan, Emily Beatty,  and Katie Mullan, Evans was a member of the UCD team that lost 3–2 to Railway Union in the Irish Senior Cup final. In the 2013–14 season UCD completed a national double when they won both the  Irish Senior Cup and their first Women's Irish Hockey League title. In the cup final Evans scored as UCD defeated Pembroke Wanderers 2–0. Other members of the double winning squad included Katie Mullan, Emily Beatty, Anna O'Flanagan, Gillian Pinder and Deirdre Duke. Evans also played for UCD in the 2015 EuroHockey Club Champions Cup.

Hermes-Monkstown
In 2015–16, Evans was a member of the Hermes team that won the Women's Irish Hockey League title and the EY Champions Trophy. Other members of the team included Anna O'Flanagan, Chloe Watkins and Naomi Carroll. In 2016 Hermes merged with Monkstown and they subsequently played as Hermes-Monkstown. Evans played for Hermes-Monkstown in the 2017 EuroHockey Club Champions Cup.

Uhlenhorster HC
In 2017–18 Evans was a member of the Uhlenhorster HC that finished as runners up in both the Women's Bundesliga and the 2018 EuroHockey Club Champions Cup.

Ireland international
Evans made her senior debut for Ireland in June 2010 against Australia in a Four Nations Tournament in Germany. In March 2015 Evans was a member of the Ireland team that won a 2014–15 Women's FIH Hockey World League Round 2 tournament hosted in Dublin. Evans scored in the final against Canada, which finished 1–1, before Ireland eventually won the tournament following a penalty shoot-out. On 10 June 2015 at the 2014–15 Women's FIH Hockey World League Semifinals, Evans scored a hat-trick against South Africa in the opening pool game. In  a second game against the same opponents in the same tournament, Evans sustained a nasty facial injury in the dying minutes of the game. In January 2017 Evans was a member of the Ireland team that won a 2016–17 Women's FIH Hockey World League Round 2 tournament in Kuala Lumpur, defeating Malaysia 3–0 in the final.

Evans represented Ireland at the 2018 Women's Hockey World Cup and was a prominent member of the team that won the silver medal. She featured in all of Ireland's games throughout the tournament, including the pool games against the United States, India, and England, the quarter-final against India, the semi-final against Spain and the final against the Netherlands.

Occupation
Together with Lizzie Colvin, Gillian Pinder, Anna O'Flanagan and Deirdre Duke,   Evans was one of five lawyers in the Ireland squad at the 2018 Women's Hockey World Cup. Between 2014 and 2017 she was a trainee solicitor with Mason, Hayes & Curran. While based in Hamburg, Evans has worked for CMS Legal Services.

Honours
Ireland
Women's Hockey World Cup
Runners Up: 2018
Women's FIH Hockey World League
Winners: 2015 Dublin, 2017 Kuala Lumpur
Women's Hockey Champions Challenge I
Runners Up: 2014
Women's Four Nations Cup
Runners Up: 2017
Women's Field Hockey Olympic Qualifier
Runners Up: 2012
UCD
Women's Irish Hockey League
Winners: 2013–14 
Irish Senior Cup
Winners: 2013–14 
Runners Up: 2012–13
Railway Union
Women's Irish Hockey League
Winners: 2009–10
Irish Senior Cup
Runners Up: 2009–10
Hermes/Hermes-Monkstown
Women's Irish Hockey League
Winners: 2015–16
Runners Up: 2008–09
EY Champions Trophy
Winners: 2015-16
Runners Up: 2016–17
All-Ireland Ladies' Club Championships
Winners: 2008
Alexandra College
Leinster Schoolgirls' Senior Cup
Winners: 2004–05, 2006–07
Runners Up: 2007–08

References

1990 births
Living people
Irish female field hockey players
Place of birth missing (living people)
Expatriate field hockey players
Irish expatriate sportspeople in Germany
Female field hockey forwards
Ireland international women's field hockey players
Railway Union field hockey players
UCD Ladies' Hockey Club players
Monkstown Hockey Club players
Uhlenhorster HC players
Women's Irish Hockey League players
Field hockey players from County Dublin
Feldhockey Bundesliga (Women's field hockey) players
People educated at Alexandra College
Alumni of University College Dublin
Irish women lawyers
21st-century Irish lawyers
Sportspeople from Dublin (city)
21st-century women lawyers